Alejandra Lara (born ) is a Colombian female mixed martial artist currently signed to the Bellator MMA promotion.  As of October 4, 2022, she is #10 in the Bellator Women's Flyweight Rankings.

Mixed martial arts career

Early career
Lara made her MMA debut on 10 December 2011 on Extreme Combat MMA Senshi Ki 1 against Monica Leon, winning the fight in round one via retirement. Before joining Bellator MMA, she amassed a record of 6 wins against 1 loss.

Bellator MMA
Lara debuted at Bellator 190 on December 9, 2017. She defeated Lena Ovchynnikova via a rear-naked choke submission in the third round. Bellator announced in February 2018 that they extended her contract with the promotion. 

In her second fight for the promotion, Lara faced Ilima-Lei Macfarlane at Bellator 201 in June 2018 for the Bellator Women's Flyweight World Championship. She lost the fight via an armbar submission in the third round.

In her third fight for the promotion, Lara faced undefeated Brazilian prospect Juliana Velasquez at Bellator 212 on December 14, 2018. She lost the fight via split decision.

Lara next fought Taylor Turner at Bellator 225 on August 24, 2019. She won the fight by TKO in the first round. Ahead of the fight, she used her appearance at the ceremonial weigh-in to draw attention to the plight of the Amazon's rain forests.

Lara then faced Veta Arteaga at Bellator 235 on December 20, 2019. She won the fight via unanimous decision and subsequently signed a new, six-fight contract with the promotion.

Lara faced undefeated Rizin standout Kana Watanabe on April 2, 2021 at Bellator 255. She lost the bout via split decision.

Lara was expected to face DeAnna Bennett on July 31, 2021 at Bellator 263. The bout was rescheduled for unknown reasons to take place on August 20, 2021 at Bellator 265. On August 13, it was announced that the bout was moved once again, this time to Bellator 266. At the weigh-ins, DeAnna Bennett missed weight for her bout. Bennett weighed in at 129.2 pounds, 3.2 pounds over the flyweight non-title fight limit. The bout proceeded at catchweight and Bennett was fined a percentage of her purse which went to Lara. Lara lost the bout in dominant fashion via unanimous decision.

Lara faced Ilara Joanne at Bellator 282 on June 24, 2022. She lost the bout via unanimous decision.

Lara faced Diana Avsaragova on February 4, 2023, at Bellator 290. At the weigh-ins, Avsaragova missed weight for her bout, coming in at 128.8 pounds, 2.8 pounds over the flyweight non-title fight limit. The bout proceeded at catchweight and Avsaragova was fined 25% of her purse which went to Lara. Lara lost the close bout via split decision. 5 out of 7 media scores gave it to Lara.

Mixed martial arts record

|-
|Loss
|align=center|9–7
|Diana Avsaragova
|Decision (split)
|Bellator 290
|
|align=center|3
|align=center|5:00
|Inglewood, California, United States
|
|-
|Loss
|align=center|9–6
|Ilara Joanne
|Decision (unanimous)
|Bellator 282
|
|align=center|3
|align=center|5:00
|Uncasville, Connecticut, United States
|
|- 
|Loss
|align=center|9–5
|DeAnna Bennett
|Decision (unanimous)
|Bellator 266
|
|align=center|3
|align=center|5:00
|San Jose, California, United States
|
|-
|Loss
|align=center|9–4
|Kana Watanabe
|Decision (split)
|Bellator 255
|
|align=center|3
|align=center|5:00
|Uncasville, Connecticut, United States
|
|-
|Win
|align=center|9–3
|Veta Arteaga
|Decision (unanimous)
|Bellator 235
|
|align=center|3
|align=center|5:00
|Honolulu, Hawaii, United States
|
|-
|Win
|align=center|8–3
|Taylor Turner
|TKO (punches)
|Bellator 225
|
|align=center|1
|align=center|3:44
|Bridgeport, Connecticut, United States
|
|-
|Loss
|align=center|7–3
|Juliana Velasquez
|Decision (split)
|Bellator 212
|
|align=center|3
|align=center|5:00
|Honolulu, Hawaii, United States 
|
|-
|Loss
|align=center|7–2
|Ilima-Lei Macfarlane
|Submission (armbar)
|Bellator 201
|
|align=center|3
|align=center|3:55
|Temecula, California, United States
|
|-
|Win
|align=center|7–1
|Lena Ovchynnikova
|Submission (rear-naked choke)
|Bellator 190
|
|align=center|3
|align=center|4:09
|Florence, Italy
|
|-
|Win
|align=center|6–1
|Lina Franco Rodriguez
|Submission (rear-naked choke)
|Empire Sports Marketing Colombia vs The World
|
|align=center|2
|align=center|2:32
|Bogotá, Colombia
|
|-
|Win
|align=center|5–1
|Janeth Alvarado
|TKO (retirement)
|Cage Fight Nights MMA League 6
|
|align=center|1
|align=center|5:00
|Zapopan, Jalisco, Mexico
|
|-
|Loss
|align=center|4–1
|Sabina Mazo
|Decision (unanimous)
|Striker Fighting Championship 18
|
|align=center|3
|align=center|5:00
|Barranquilla, Atlantico, Colombia
|
|-
|Win
|align=center|4–0
|Paola Calderon
|Technical Submission (armbar)
|Striker Fighting Championship 12
|
|align=center|1
|align=center|0:35
|Bogotá, Colombia
|
|-
|Win
|align=center|3–0
|Paola Calderon
|Decision (unanimous)
|Striker Fighting Championship 9
|
|align=center|3
|align=center|5:00
|Bogotá, Colombia
|
|-
|Win
|align=center|2–0
|Maria Aguero
|TKO (punches)
|Professional Fight Club
|
|align=center|1
|align=center|1:03
|Envigado, Antioquia, Colombia
|
|-
|Win
|align=center|1–0
|Monica Leon
|TKO (retirement)
|Extreme Combat MMA Senshi Ki
|
|align=center|1
|align=center|2:22
|Rionegro, Antioquia, Colombia
|
|}

References

External links
 Bellator Profile
 

1994 births
Living people
Colombian female mixed martial artists
Sportspeople from Medellín
Flyweight mixed martial artists
21st-century Colombian women